Michael Waldron (born April 23, 1987) is an American screenwriter and producer known for his work on television series Rick and Morty and Heels, as well as creating the Marvel Cinematic Universe series Loki and writing the script for Doctor Strange in the Multiverse of Madness (2022) and Avengers: Secret Wars (2026).

Career 
In February 2014, Waldron was enrolled in the MFA screenwriting program at Pepperdine University and was an intern for the Adult Swim show Rick and Morty during its first season when he was hired by the show's co-creator Dan Harmon to be part of the production staff of Harmon's NBC series Community for its fifth season. In February 2017, he was writing the series Heels for Starz. By August 2017, he was executive producing the YouTube Red series Good Game.

In February 2019, he was hired as head writer and executive producer on the Disney+ series Loki (2021). In November 2019, after producing several Rick and Morty episodes, Waldron wrote the season four episode "The Old Man and the Seat". In February 2020, he began writing the script for the film Doctor Strange in the Multiverse of Madness (2022). In January 2021, he was hired to write the screenplay for Kevin Feige's untitled Star Wars film, while also signing an overall deal with Disney. 

On October 3, 2022, Deadline Hollywood reported that Waldron would once again be collaborating with Marvel Studios, having been set to script Avengers: Secret Wars, set to be released on May 1, 2026.

In March 2023, Waldron launched a new feature film and television production company, Anomaly Pictures, with his producing partner Adam Fasullo.

Filmography

Accolades

References

External links 
 

1987 births
21st-century American comedians
21st-century American male writers
21st-century American screenwriters
American comedy writers
American male screenwriters
American male television writers
American television writers
Living people
Pepperdine University alumni
Place of birth missing (living people)
Primetime Emmy Award winners
Showrunners